Andreas Bordan (born 14 May 1964) is a retired German football midfielder.

References

External links
 

1964 births
Living people
German footballers
Bundesliga players
2. Bundesliga players
VfL Bochum players
SV Darmstadt 98 players
Association football midfielders